Johann Cothmann (1588 in Lemgo - 1661, Güstrow) was a German jurist and diplomat. He was also a member of the Fruitbearing Society.

1588 births
1661 deaths
German diplomats
Jurists from North Rhine-Westphalia
People from Lemgo